Saint Thaddeus and Bartholomew Cathedral, also known as the Budagovski Cathedral was an Armenian Apostolic church in Baku, Azerbaijan, built in 1910 and consecrated in 1911. It was located on the Bondarnaya-Dmitrova street (now known as Shamsi Badalbeyli street). 

Construction began on 2 August 1907 and was completed in 1910. The architect of the church was Hovhannes Kajaznuni.

As part of the policy of destruction of religious buildings of the USSR government, the Cathedral was demolished in 1930, to be replaced with the building of the Baku Academy of Music.

References

Armenian churches in Azerbaijan
Churches completed in 1910
Christian organizations established in 1911
Cathedrals in Baku
Destroyed churches
Former religious buildings and structures in Azerbaijan
Churches in Baku
Demolished churches in the Soviet Union
Buildings and structures demolished in 1930
Demolished buildings and structures in Azerbaijan